Natalie D'Alessandro (born June 16, 2004) is a Canadian retired ice dancer. With her skating partner, Bruce Waddell, she is the 2022 World Junior silver medallist and 2022 Canadian national junior champion. They have won three medals on the ISU Junior Grand Prix series, including gold at the 2021 JGP Slovakia, and bronze in the 2020 Winter Youth Olympics team event.

Personal life 
D'Alessandro has two brothers. She enjoys photography and baking.

Skating career 
D'Alessandro started skating in 2007 and initially competed in singles, winning a bronze medal in the novice ladies' event at the 2016 Canadian Championships.

Both D'Alessandro and Bruce Waddell trained as singles skaters at the Toronto Cricket, Skating and Curling Club, and initially tried out as a dance team at the suggestion of the TCC's dance coach, Andrew Hallam.  D'Alessandro/Waddell were pre-novice champions at the 2016 Skate Canada Challenge, and then won the novice title at the 2017 Canadian Championships.  Making their international debut as a dance team, they placed fourth at the 2017 Bavarian Open in the advanced novice division.

2017–18 season: Junior debut
D'Alessandro/Waddell were assigned by Skate Canada to make their debut on the ISU Junior Grand Prix, with one assignment to the 2017 JGP Australia in Brisbane.  Placing sixth, Waddell commented that the international competition made them "more nervous than usual."  Competing at the 2018 Canadian Junior Championships, they placed eighth.

2018–19 season: Junior national bronze
Given two assignments on the Junior Grand Prix, D'Alessandro/Waddell were fourth at the 2018 JGP Austria and sixth at the 2018 JGP Canada, the latter held in Richmond, British Columbia.  Competing at the 2019 Canadian Junior Championships, they won the bronze medal.

2019–20 season: First JGP medal
Again assigned to two events on the Junior Grand Prix, D'Alessandro/Waddell began the season at the 2019 JGP Latvia, where they placed fourth, missing the bronze medal by 0.68 points after sitting in third after the rhythm dance.  At their second event, the 2019 JGP Italy, they won the silver medal, the highest colour of medal won by a Canadian dance team on the Junior Grand Prix that season.  D'Alessandro commented afterwards "seeing your name on the podium with the Canadian flag next to it is a pretty cool feeling."

D'Alessandro/Waddell won the gold at the 2020 Skate Canada Challenge.  This would be their final domestic competition of the season, as they were assigned as part of the Canadian delegation to the 2020 Winter Youth Olympics in Lausanne, which both had had as a longtime goal.  Competing in the ice dance event in Lausanne, D'Alessandro/Waddell placed third in the rhythm dance despite encountering level issues on several elements. These continued in the free dance, where they placed fifth, and dropped to fourth place overall, 0.91 points behind bronze medallists Wolfkostin/Chen.  Waddell said after "there were a few technical errors but I definitely still had a blast."  They subsequently won a bronze medal in the team event.

Skate Canada assigned D'Alessandro/Waddell to one of Canada's three berths at the 2020 World Junior Championships in Tallinn, Estonia, and also to compete at the 2020 Bavarian Open in the junior division.  They won the bronze medal, narrowly behind fellow Canadians Bronsard/Bouaraguia.  D'Alessandro/Waddell finished the season at the World Junior Championships, where they placed eleventh, narrowly behind the other Canadian teams competing, Bronsard/Bouraguia and Makita/Gunara.

2020–21 season
With the COVID-19 pandemic severely constraining competitions, both the ISU Junior Grand Prix and the 2021 World Junior Championships were cancelled.  As well, in-person domestic competition was limited, as a result of which D'Alessandro/Waddell competed only once during the season, at a virtually-held 2021 Skate Canada Challenge.  They won the gold medal.  The 2021 Canadian Junior Championships were subsequently cancelled.

2021–22 season: World Junior silver
With the resumption of the Junior Grand Prix, D'Alessandro/Waddell returned to international competition at the 2021 JGP Slovakia in Košice.  Second in the rhythm dance behind the Russians Kaganovskaia/Angelopol, they won the free dance after a poorly-designed choreographic element resulted in the Russians receiving two fall deductions, and took the gold medal.  They were the only non-Russian gold medallists at the event. D'Alessandro commented on the effects of the pandemic, saying the long absence from competition "made us hungrier and more excited to come out here." Weeks later at their second event, the 2021 JGP Slovenia in Ljubljana, they won the bronze medal behind Kaganovskaia/Angelopol and top Americans Wolfkostin/Chen.

In November, D'Alessandro/Waddell competed at the junior event at the 2021 Ice Challenge in Graz. Second in the short program, they won the free dance and took the gold medal, their second international win of the season. Waddell assessed the result as having had "lots of positives but also a couple of negatives we weren't as happy about. But that’s super necessary for us to happen in order to realize the difference between this and an amazing performance." While their results on the Junior Grand Prix had qualified them to the Junior Grand Prix Final in December, this event was cancelled as a result of restrictions prompted by the Omicron variant.

Entering the 2022 Canadian Junior Championships as the favourites for the gold medal, they won both programs to take their first national junior title. They were subsequently sent to compete at the Egna Trophy, taking the silver medal in the junior competition.

Due to the pandemic, the 2022 World Junior Championships could not be held as scheduled in Sofia in early March, and as a result were rescheduled for Tallinn in mid-April. Due to Vladimir Putin's invasion of Ukraine, the International Skating Union banned all Russian and Belarusian athletes from participating, which had a significant impact on the dance field. As a result, D'Alessandro/Waddell entered the event as major medal contenders alongside Americans Wolfkostin/Chen and Brown/Brown. In the rhythm dance, D'Alessandro/Waddell scored an even 64 points, finishing in second place behind the Browns with 66.98. Fellow Canadians Bashynska/Beaumont were third, while Wolfkostin/Chen were distantly in ninth after she fell on her twizzle sequence. They were third in the free dance, behind Brown/Brown and Wolfkostin/Chen, but won the silver medal. D'Alessandro said afterward that "this season we've trained so hard, so many mornings, and finishing it off on the podium at a competition like this...it still has not sunk in." With Bashynska/Beaumont winning the bronze medal, it was the first time two Canadian dance teams had stood on the podium together at the World Junior Championships.

On May 3, 2022, D'Alessandro and Waddell announced on their joint Instagram account that they would no longer be skating together, stating "the time has come when we are excited to move on with new separate adventures." D'Alessandro said that she was retiring to pursue university studies full-time.

Programs

Competitive highlights 
JGP: Junior Grand Prix

With Waddell

Ladies' singles

Detailed results 
ISU Personal Bests highlighted in bold.

 With Waddell

Junior results

References

External links 
 

2004 births
Living people
Canadian female ice dancers
Figure skaters at the 2020 Winter Youth Olympics
Figure skaters from Toronto
World Junior Figure Skating Championships medalists
Youth Olympic bronze medalists for Canada
Medalists at the 2020 Winter Youth Olympics